Kington Museum is a volunteer-run local history museum in the market town of Kington, Herefordshire, England. It opened in June 1986 and occupies the stable block of the former King’s Head Inn (demolished 1885). The building was extended in 1988, 1991 and 2005.

References

External links 

 
 

Museums in Herefordshire
Kington, Herefordshire